Nicholas Altrock (September 15, 1876 – January 20, 1965) was an American professional baseball player and coach. He played in the major leagues as a left-handed pitcher between 1898 and 1919. After the 1919 season he continued to make periodic appearances as a pinch hitter for many years, until his final game at the age of 57. As a player, Altrock was a member of two World Series winning teams and then won a third World Series as a coach. He was a coach for the Washington Senators for many years.

Biography
Altrock was born in Cincinnati, to German immigrant parents. He was instrumental in the White Sox World Series championship in 1906, going 20–13 with a 2.06 earned run average in the regular season and 1–1 with a Series-best 1.00 earned run average against the Chicago Cubs.

He appeared in major league games in five different decades, one of only two players to do this (Minnie Miñoso is the other); he is one of only 29 players in baseball history to have appeared in major league games in four decades.

Some Senator scorecards continued to list Altrock as a "coach emeritus" even after his formal retirement.

During that time, he was noted for his antics in the coaching box and teamed with Al Schacht, the "Clown Prince of Baseball", for a dozen years to perform comedy routines on baseball fields in the days before official mascots. Schacht and Altrock also took their antics to the vaudeville stage where they appeared in a comedy routine. At the height of their collaboration, Schacht and Altrock developed a deep personal animosity and stopped speaking with each other off the field. During their famous comic re-enactments of the Dempsey–Tunney championship boxing match, many speculated that they pulled no punches as they rained blows on each other.

An anecdote, probably apocryphal, has been printed in some baseball books about a quip by Altrock during his coaching days with the Senators. A batter had hit a ball into the stands and it was not known whether it was fair or foul. The umpire, who had been the target of Altrock's gibes, made the call and shortly afterward a woman was carried from the stands on a litter. The umpire asked Altrock if the ball had hit the woman. In his clear voice, Nick answered, "No. You called that one right and she passed out from shock."

He was the second oldest position player to play in a major league game when he played in 1933 at the age of 57.

Altrock lived for many years in the Columbia Heights neighborhood of Washington, D.C., with his wife Eleanor, and died at age 88 in 1965. He is interred at Vine Street Hill Cemetery in Cincinnati.

See also

Nick Altrock: A Columbia Heights Major Leaguer - Ghosts of DC
List of Major League Baseball players who played in four decades

References

Further reading
Altrock Wasn't Always A Clown; Was Great Pitcher, by Harry Grayson, June 20, 1943

External links

, or Baseball Almanac, or Retrosheet

1876 births
1965 deaths
19th-century baseball players
American people of German descent
Baseball coaches from Ohio
Baseball players from Cincinnati
Boston Americans players
Burials at Vine Street Hill Cemetery
Chicago White Sox players
Columbus Senators players
Grand Rapids Cabinet Makers players
Grand Rapids Furniture Makers players
Kansas City Blues (baseball) players
Los Angeles Angels (minor league) players
Louisville Colonels players
Major League Baseball pitchers
Major League Baseball pitching coaches
Milwaukee Brewers (minor league) players
Minneapolis Millers (baseball) players
Navy Midshipmen baseball coaches
Oswego Grays players
Springfield Wanderers players
Syracuse Stars (minor league baseball) players
Toronto Royals players
Vaudeville performers
Washington Senators (1901–1960) coaches
Washington Senators (1901–1960) players